Mercy Hospital St. Louis is a hospital operating in Creve Coeur, Missouri, United States, sponsored by the Sisters of Mercy.

History
St. John Mercy medical center was founded by the Sisters of Mercy in 1871 in downtown St. Louis as a 25-bed hospital in a school building. In 1963, the hospital's current location was founded in Creve Coeur, Missouri. Since then, it has expanded, treating patients in the St. Louis region and other parts of Missouri. In 2018, Mercy Hospital announced plans to open ten primary health care facilities in the St. Louis Metropolitan Area, along with 20 urgent health care centers.

In 2020, the first coronavirus patient in Missouri, a Washington University student returning from Italy, was quarantined at Mercy Hospital.

Capacity

Mercy Hospital has a level III neonatal intensive care unit as well as the only Level I Trauma center in St. Louis County, Missouri. The hospital also has the David C. Pratt Cancer Center, a heart and vascular hospital, the only pediatric children's hospital in St. Louis County, and a low-risk birthing center.

Mercy Hospital St. Louis is part of the greater organization Mercy Health.

The hospital has 1,252 beds.

It has a HIMSS State 7 Ranking, making it one of the most technologically advanced hospitals in the country, with an extensive electronic health care system. In 2018, the hospital's children wing earned a gold seal of approval for pediatric asthma, making it the only asthma-certified children hospital in the state.

References

External links
 Mercy Hospital St. Louis's website

Hospital buildings completed in 1963
Hospitals in Missouri
Hospitals in St. Louis
1963 establishments in Missouri
Buildings and structures in St. Louis County, Missouri